Håkan Brock (born 15 May 1961) is a Swedish boxer. He competed in the men's heavyweight event at the 1984 Summer Olympics.

References

External links
 

1961 births
Living people
Swedish male boxers
Olympic boxers of Sweden
Boxers at the 1984 Summer Olympics
Sportspeople from Lund
Heavyweight boxers